Dabis may refer to:

Dabis, Syria, a village in Aleppo Governorate, Syria
Anna Dabis (1847–1927), German sculptor
Cherien Dabis (born 1976), American film director

See also
Abu Dabis, a village in Khuzestan Province, Iran